Elena Igorevna Grigoryants ((b. August 12, 1965 in Leningrad) is a Soviet and Russian culturologist, art critic, curator. Associate Professor. PhD in Philosophy, member of  Association of Specialists in Art History.

Biography 
Elena Grigoryants was born in Leningrad 12 of August 1965. Elena studied at the Librarys Faculty of the Saint-Petersburg State University of Culture and Arts from 1983–1986. Joined the Art Critics Association (ACA) member (since 2003). PhD in Art History with the thesis “The book in culture” (1993).

Elena Grigoryants the author of more than 200 articles on the history of Russian artist's book, and graphics art, including the artists of St. Petersburg Alexey Parygin, Andrey Korolchuk, Georgy Kovenchuk, and (P. Veshchev, E. Gindper, S. Koltsov, Yu. Yu. Klever, M. Klodt, A. Korzukhin, N. Koshelev, Ya. Krestovsky, O. Kotelnikov, M. Karasik, G. Katsnelson, Yu. Lyukshin, G. Lavrenko, A. Molev, A. Florensky, V. Shinkarev and others) for the German academic directory Allgemeines Künstlerlexikon Die Bildenden Künstler aller Zeiten und Völker (AKL).

Elena Grigoryants lives and works in St. Petersburg.

Bibliography
 City as Artist's subjectivity. Artist's book project. Catalog. Authors of the articles: Parygin A.B., Markov T.A., Klimova E.D., Borovsky A.D., Severyukhin D.Ya., Grigoryants E.I., Blagodatov N.I. (Rus & En) — SPb: Ed. T. Markova. 2020. — 128 p. 
 Grigoryants El. The Futurist Tradition in Contemporary Russian Artists’ Books // International Yearbook of Futurism Studies / Special Issue on Russian Futurism. Ed. by Günter Berghaus. — Walter de Gruyter. Vol. 9 — 2019, 520 p. — pp. 269–296 .
 Grigoryants El. В мастерской Алексея Парыгина «Невский—25» // St. Petersburg art notebooks, # 38, St. Petersburg: AIS, 2015, pp. 88–92. (Rus)
 Grigoryants El. Искусство книги и книга в искусстве // Первая Балтийская биеннале искусства книги: каталог выставки. — СПб., 2014. — С. 6-9. (Rus)
 Grigoryants El. Образ текста в современной петербургской «книге художника» и livre d`artiste // Печать и слово Санкт-Петербурга: Сборник научных трудов. Ч.1 — СПб., 2014. (Rus)
 J. J. Klever // Allgemeines Künstlerlexikon. Band 80 — 2013, 540 S. — Walter de Gruyter.
 A. I. Korzuchin; O. Kotel’nikov; N. A. Koselev; J. I. Krestovskiy; S. V. Kol’cov // Allgemeines Künstlerlexikon. Band 81 — 2013, 540 P. — Walter de Gruyter.
 Grigoryants El. «Автографическая книга» в рамках направления «Artists book» («книга художника» // XX век. Две России — одна культура: Сборник научных трудов по материалам 14 Смирдинских чтений. — СПб, 2006. (Rus)
 Grigoryants El. Диалоги культур в современной петербургской книге художника // Книжная культура Петербурга: Сборник научных трудов по материалам 13 Смирдинских чтений. — СПб: СПбГИК, 2004. (Rus)
 Grigoryants El. «Книга художника» в современном петербургском искусстве // Актуальные проблемы теории и истории библиофильства: Материалы 8 международной научной конференции. — СПб., 2001 — С. 124–128. (Rus)
 Grigoryants E. I. Images by Alexei Parygin // St. Petersburg Panorama, 1993, No. 3. — P. 11. (RUS).

References

1965 births
Year of death missing
Russian art historians